He Couldn't Take It is a 1933 American comedy film directed by William Nigh and starring Ray Walker, Virginia Cherrill and George E. Stone. The script was written by Dore Schary and George Waggner and was made for Monogram Pictures.

Cast
 Ray Walker as Jimmy Case 
 Virginia Cherrill as Eleanor Rogers 
 George E. Stone as Sammy Kohn 
 Stanley Fields as Sweet Sue 
 Dorothy Granger as Grace Clarice 
 Jane Darwell as Mrs. Case 
 Paul Porcasi as Nick 
 Don Douglas as Oakley 
 Astrid Allwyn as Blonde 
 Franklin Parker as Radio Announcer 
 Jack Kennedy as Driscoll 
 Ed Brady as Passenger 
 George Cleveland as Drunk 
 Olaf Hytten as Professor Brewster Stevens 
 Florence Turner as Elderly Lady

References

Bibliography
 Alan G. Fetrow. Sound films, 1927-1939: a United States filmography. McFarland, 1992.

External links
He Couldn't Take It at TCMDB
He Couldn't Take It at IMDb

1933 films
Monogram Pictures films
American comedy films
1933 comedy films
American black-and-white films
Films directed by William Nigh
1930s English-language films
1930s American films